Dika Stojanović may refer to:

Aleksandar Stojanović (goalkeeper)
Stevan Stojanović